Gorka Maneiro Labayen (born 1975 in San Sebastián) is a Spanish politician and a member of the Basque Parliament with the Union, Progress and Democracy party (UPyD).

He studied business sciences and is a technician in fiscality. 
A former member of the Spanish Socialist Workers' Party (PSOE) from 2002 to 2007, since 2009 he has been a member of the direction council of UPyD. He was in the group of members of the civic platform ¡Basta Ya! that entered in the new party. He was a candidate for Guipúzcoa in the 2008 general election with UPyD, and also to the Senate in 2011 for Álava.

References

1974 births
Living people
Members of the 9th Basque Parliament
Members of the 10th Basque Parliament
Politicians from San Sebastián
Union, Progress and Democracy politicians
University of the Basque Country alumni